Anel Šabanadžović (born 24 May 1999) is a Bosnian professional footballer who plays as a midfielder for Greek Super League 2 club AEK Athens B.

Šabanadžović started his professional career at Željezničar, before joining AEK Athens in 2019. In 2021, he was loaned back to Željezničar.

Club career

Željezničar
Šabanadžović came through Željezničar's youth academy, which he joined in 2007. He made his professional debut in a cup game against Goražde on 26 October 2016 at the age of 17 and managed to score a goal. On 24 July 2017, he made his league debut against GOŠK. Šabanadžović won his first trophy with the club on 9 May 2018, by beating Krupa in Bosnian Cup final.

AEK Athens
In January 2019, Greek side AEK Athens announced that Šabanadžović would join them the following season on a five-year contract. He made his competitive debut for the club in a triumph over Panionios on 7 December.

In March 2021, he was loaned to his former club Željezničar until the end of season.

International career
Šabanadžović represented Bosnia and Herzegovina on all youth levels.

In March 2020, he received his first senior call-up, for UEFA Euro 2020 qualifying play-offs against Northern Ireland.

Personal life
Šabanadžović's father, Refik, was also a professional footballer.

Career statistics

Club

Honours
Željezničar
Bosnian Cup: 2017–18

References

External links

1999 births
Living people
People from Jackson, Missouri
American people of Bosnia and Herzegovina descent
Bosnia and Herzegovina footballers
Bosnia and Herzegovina youth international footballers
Bosnia and Herzegovina under-21 international footballers
Bosnia and Herzegovina expatriate footballers
Association football midfielders
FK Željezničar Sarajevo players
AEK Athens F.C. players
Premier League of Bosnia and Herzegovina players
Super League Greece players
Expatriate footballers in Greece
Bosnia and Herzegovina expatriate sportspeople in Greece
Soccer players from Missouri
AEK Athens F.C. B players